Charge Pond is a  warm water lake in Plymouth, Massachusetts. It is located within a camping area in the southernmost section of Myles Standish State Forest, south of Fearing Pond, southwest of Abner Pond, and northwest of Little Long Pond. The lake is fed by groundwater and is the headwaters to Harlow Brook.

External links
MassWildlife – Pond Maps

Lakes of Plymouth, Massachusetts
Lakes of Massachusetts